Dillian Whyte vs Jermaine Franklin, billed as Maximum Violence was a professional heavyweight boxing match contested between former WBC interim heavyweight champion Dillian Whyte and Jermaine Franklin.

The bout was held at the Wembley Arena, London, England on the 26 November 2022.

Background

Fight card

Reference:

References

2022 in boxing
2022 in British sport
November 2022 sports events in the United Kingdom
2022 sports events in London
International sports competitions in London
Pay-per-view boxing matches